Agnes I (1170 – in 1192 or 1193 in Mailly), Countess of Nevers, Auxerre and Tonnerre (1185-1192), daughter of Guy, Count of Nevers, Auxerre and Tonnerre, and Mathilde de Burgundy, dame of Montpensier.

Biography 

Heiress of the counties of Nevers, Auxerre and Tonnerre at the death of her brother William V in 1181, she was initially married to Olivier "Albus," lord of Grignon († 1181/84). When Olivier died, King Philip Augustus arranged her marriage in 1184 - she was 14 - with Peter II of Courtenay.

In 1185, she and her husband Peter confirmed by charter the privileges of the church of Saint-Étienne, and on 10 June 1190 they renounced by charter their hereditary rights in favor of Saint-Cyr. In 1191 they bought Tonnerre of Agnes's mother, Mathilde of Burgundy.

She died in 1192 or 1193, while her husband fought in the Holy Land with the Third Crusade, leaving a daughter, Matilda (1188 † 1257), Countess of Nevers, Auxerre and Tonnerre, who married with Hervé IV of Donzy († 1222) in 1199, and in 1226 with Guigues IV of Forez († 1241).

References

Further reading

1170 births
1190s deaths
12th-century women rulers
Counts of Nevers
Counts of Auxerre